Everything Else Has Gone Wrong is the fifth studio album by the British indie rock band Bombay Bicycle Club. It was released on 17 January 2020 by the band's own Mmm... Records imprint of Island Records, Caroline International and Arts & Crafts. It is their first album in nearly six years, since the release of So Long, See You Tomorrow (2014).

The album debuted at number one on the UK's Official Record Store Chart.

Background and recording
Bombay Bicycle Club announced an indefinite hiatus on 29 January 2016. However, they explicitly ruled out the notion that the band was breaking up and also alluded toward potential solo material from frontman Jack Steadman and from bassist Ed Nash. However, in an interview with Q Nash recalled Steadman saying that he did not think he wanted to make another Bombay Bicycle Club album. In January 2017, Nash released the solo album The Pace of the Passing under the moniker Toothless. It featured vocals by Marika Hackman, Tom Fleming, Liz Lawrence and The Staves. Bombay Bicycle Club drummer Suren de Saram contributed drumming to the record. The album was produced by Nash and Steadman. In March 2017, Steadman formed the solo project Mr Jukes, releasing the album God First in July 2017. The album was produced by Steadman and featured BJ the Chicago Kid, Elli Ingram, Charles Bradley, De La Soul, Horace Andy, Lalah Hathaway, Lianne La Havas. During the band's hiatus, guitarist Jamie MacColl completed an undergraduate degree in war studies at King's College London and a MPhil in international relations at the University of Cambridge. He worked as an intelligence analyst for a social security company and also worked at a think tank in Washington, D.C. He also launched Undivided, a Brexit campaign group to engage with people under the age of 30. Nash worked for some time in an office job in the interim. Steadman traveled extensively, including traveling on the Trans-Siberian Railway as well as riding on a cargo ship from China to Canada.

The band later sold all of their equipment and initially had no plans to record new music or tour. MacColl believed the band had effectively broken up, but was surprised when Steadman decided to be in the band again. Months after selling their equipment, they discussed the possibility of doing a one-off tour to celebrate the tenth anniversary of their debut album I Had the Blues But I Shook Them Loose (2009). However, they believed a one-off anniversary tour was not appropriate considering they were a relatively young band and since they felt they still had ideas for music. They instead quickly focused on writing new music.

In January 2019, the band announced that they were ending their hiatus and that they would be performing concerts later in 2019, with intentions to record new music as well. Bombay Bicycle Club began recording for Everything Else Has Gone Wrong on 25 March 2019 at Konk Studios in London. The band released an extended play of demos from 2004 to 2008 on 3 July 2019, marking exactly ten years since the release of their debut album on 3 July 2009. The band completed recording for the album on 14 September 2019 with producer John Congleton at Sargent Recorders in Los Angeles, California. The album was primarily produced by John Congleton with additional production by Steadman, except "Racing Stripes" which was produced by both Congleton and Steadman.

Release and promotion
The lead single to promote the album, "Eat, Sleep, Wake (Nothing but You)", was released on 27 August 2019. A music video directed by Louis Bhose, the band's former touring keyboardist, was released on 3 September 2019 and was shot in Ukraine.

The second single, "Everything Else Has Gone Wrong", was released on 27 November 2019. An accompanying music video directed by Louis Bhose was released the same day.

On 19 December 2019, "Racing Stripes" was released as the third single with an accompanying music video directed by Louis Bhose and shot in the Lofoten Islands of northern Norway.

"I Can Hardly Speak" was released as the fourth single on 1 January 2020.

"Is It Real" was released as the fifth single on 14 January 2020.

Artwork
The artwork illustrations for the album and its singles were commissioned by the band from Spanish artist María Medem.

Critical reception

Everything Else Has Gone Wrong received mostly favourable reviews from contemporary music critics. At Metacritic, which assigns a normalised rating out of 100 from reviews from mainstream critics, the album received a score of 74, based on sixteen reviews, indicating "generally favorable reviews". Aggregator AnyDecentMusic? gave it 7.4 out of 10, based on their assessment of the critical consensus.

Niall Doherty of Q gave the album a favourable review, writing, "Jack Steadman's breezy melodies are the perfect counter to the mutating musical backdrop." Greg Cochrane of Uncut gave the album a favourable review, calling "Good Day" its "vulnerable centerpiece" and "Eat, Sleep, Wake (Nothing but You)" a "reminder of how far they've advanced since their early badge as adolescent indie rockers."

Track listing

Notes
  signifies an additional producer.

Personnel
Credits adapted from the liner notes of Everything Else Has Gone Wrong.

Bombay Bicycle Club
 Jack Steadman
 Jamie MacColl
 Suren De Saram
 Ed Nash

Additional musicians
 Liz Lawrence – vocals , backing vocals 
 Billie Marten – backing vocals 
 Nate Walcott – trumpet 
 Aniela Marie Perry – cello 
 Elizabeth Baba – violin 
 Madeline Falcone – violin 
 Marta Sofia Honer – viola 
 David Moyer – tenor saxophone 
 David Urquidi – tenor saxophone 

Technical
 Jack Steadman – production , additional production 
 John Congleton – production , mixing , engineering 
 Greg Calbi – mastering
 Sean Cook – assistant engineer 
 George Chung – assistant engineer 

Artwork
 María Medem – artwork illustrations
 Joe Prytherch – artwork layout, logo

Charts

See also
List of 2020 albums

References

2020 albums
Bombay Bicycle Club albums
Albums produced by John Congleton
Island Records albums